The Latvia national baseball team is the national baseball team of Latvia. The team represents Latvia in international competitions. It has played in the  2012 European Qualification and Interlyga tournaments.

2011 team roster

National baseball teams in Europe
baseball